The Malwa Sultanate was a late medieval Islamic sultanate in the Malwa region, covering the present day Indian states of Madhya Pradesh and south-eastern Rajasthan from 1392 to 1562. It was founded by Dilawar Khan, who following Timur's invasion and the disintegration of the Delhi Sultanate, in 1401/2, made Malwa an independent realm. In 1561, the Sultanate was conquered by the Mughal empire from its last ruler, Baz Bahadur and it became a subah of the empire.

Origin
Dilawar Khan was an Afghan or a Turco-Afghan governor of the Delhi Sultanate. Dilawar Khan had ceased to pay tribute to Delhi after 1392. In 1437, the Ghurid dynasty of Dilawar Khan was overthrown by Mahmud Khan, a Khilji Turk.

History

Ghurid dynasty
The sultanate of Malwa was founded by Dilawar Khan Ghuri, the governor of Malwa for the Delhi Sultanate, who asserted his independence in 1392, but did not actually assume the ensigns of royalty till 1401. Initially Dhar was the capital of the new kingdom, but soon it was shifted to Mandu, which was renamed Shadiabad (the city of joy). After his death, he was succeeded by his son Alp Khan, who assumed the title of Hoshang Shah.

The Muzaffarids under the Punjabi origin Zafar Khan Muzaffar Shah I accused Hoshang of parricide and invaded Malwa. Hoshang was defeated and captured as a prisoner, while a Muzaffarid governor was appointed in his pace at Dhar.

Khalji dynasty
The Ghurid dynasty, founded by Dilawar Khan Ghuri, was replaced by Mahmud Shah I, who proclaimed himself king on 16 May 1436. The Khalji dynasty, founded by him, ruled over Malwa till 1531.

The sultanate saw heavy decline in 1519 after the continues invasions of Rajput emperor Rana Sanga of Mewar. Mahmud Khalji I was succeeded by his eldest son Ghiyas-ud-Din.
The last days of Ghiyas-ud-Din were embittered by a struggle for throne between his two sons, with Nasir-ud-Din emerging victorious over Ala-ud-Din and ascending the throne on 22 October 1500,  The last ruler Mahmud Shah II surrendered to Bahadur Shah, the sultan of Gujarat after the fort of Mandu fell to Bahadur on 25 May 1531.

Muzaffarid Conquest
Since 1518, Mahmud Shah II was a vassal of the Gujarat Sultan. The last ruler Mahmud Shah II surrendered to Bahadur Shah, the sultan of Gujarat after the fort of Mandu fell to Bahadur on 25 May 1531. During 1531 – 1537 the kingdom was annexed under the control of Bahadur Shah, though the Mughal emperor Humayun captured it for a short period during 1535-36. The Gujaratis regained Malwa giving allegiance to Bahadur Shah until 1542.

Restored Khalji dynasty
In 1537, Qadir Shah, an ex-officer of the previous Khalji dynasty rulers, regained control over a part of the erstwhile kingdom. But in 1542, Sher Shah Suri conquered the kingdom, defeating him and appointed Shuja'at Khan as the governor. His son, Baz Bahadur, declared himself independent in 1555. Darya Khan Gujarati, the ex-Wazir of Mahmud Khan of Gujarat ruled Ujjain.

In 1561, emperor Akbar sent the Mughal army, led by Adham Khan and Pir Muhammad Khan, which attacked Malwa and defeated Baz Bahadur in the battle of Sarangpur on 29 March 1561, culminating in the Mughal conquest of Malwa. Akbar soon recalled Adham Khan and made over command to Pir Muhammad. Pir Muhammad attacked Khandesh and proceeded up to Burhanpur, but he was defeated by a coalition of three powers: Miran Mubarak Shah II of Khandesh, Tufal Khan of Berar Sultanate and Baz Bahadur. Pir Muhammad died while retreating. The confederate army pursued the Mughals and drove them out of Malwa. Baz Bahadur regained his kingdom for a short period. In 1562, Akbar sent another army, led by Abdullah Khan, an Uzbeg, which finally defeated Baz Bahadur. He fled to Chittor. It became the Malwa Subah (top-level province) of the Mughal empire, with seat at Ujjain and Abdullah Khan became its first governor.

Art and architecture

Malwa painting
Many remarkable illustrated manuscripts were prepared during the period of the sultanate.  An illustrated manuscript of Kalpa Sutra (1439) (presently in the National Museum, Delhi) was prepared in Mandu during the reign of Mahmud Shah I But the most interesting is a manuscript of the Nimat Nama, a treatise on the art of cooking, which bears many portraits of Ghiyas-ud-Din Shah but the colophon bears the name of Nasir-ud-Din Shah. The other notable illustrated manuscripts of this period are of the Miftah-ul-Fuzala, a dictionary of rare words, the Bustan (1502) painted by Haji Mahmud and the Aja'ib-us-San'ati (1508). Another manuscript of the Anwar-i-Suhaili (now in the National Museum, Delhi) probably also belong to this period.

Malwa architecture
 
The monuments built during the sultanate period are almost concentrated in Mandu city. The early monuments were assembled out of the materials of earlier Hindu temples, according to the Islamic plan and convention. But nothing seems to have been done to conceal or alter their essential Hindu appearance. The significant among them are the Kamal Maula Masjid (c.1400), the Lal Masjid (1405), Dilawar Khan's Masjid (c.1405) and the Masjid of Malik Mughis (1452) in Mandu.

Hoshang Shah laid the foundation of the Mandu fort on the ruins of the original fortification. With him began the second and the classical phase of Malwa architecture. Some of the ten gateways on the 25 miles long wall of the fortress of Mandu were built by the Malwa sultans, the earliest one being the Delhi Darwaza (northern gateway). Within the walls of the fortress, presently only forty structures survive in different stages of preservation. The largest and most impressive of them is Jami Masjid, which according to an inscription was begun by Hoshang Shah and completed by Mahmud Shah I in 1454. The remarkable Durbar hall, known as the Hindola Mahal is also attributed to Hoshang Shah. Opposite to Jami Masjid, the large structural complex known as the Ashrafi Mahal comprises a group of buildings successively built in course of a rather long period. Its original nucleus seems to be a madrasa building erected as an adjunct to the Jami Masjid, probably during the reign of Hoshang Shah. According to Firishta, the tomb of Hoshang Shah was built by Mahmud Shah I. The later mausoleums, such as the tomb of Darya Khan, the Dai ka Mahal and the Chhappan Mahal were built on the same design. A long structural complex situated between two lakes has a curious name, the Jahaz Mahal (ship-palace). Though the date of this monument is not definitely known, its general style is in accord with the character of Ghiyas-ud-Din Khalji. A lonely building on the slope of a hill by the side of Riwa Kund is known by the local people as Baz Bahadur's palace. According to an inscription this monument was actually built by Nasir-ud-Din Shah. The Rani Rupmati Pavilion stands on the southern edge of the plateau and as its situation and form indicate, was, in all probability, designed for military purposes.

Rulers

The Ghurid/Ghorid dynasty (1401–36)

Dilawar Khan 1401–1406 
Husam-ud-Din Hoshang Shah 1406–1435 
Taj-ud-Din Muhammad Shah I 1435–1436

The Khalji dynasty (1436–1531) 
Ala-ud-Din Mahmud Shah I 1436–1469 
Ghiyas-ud-Din Shah 1469–1500 
Nasir-ud-Din Shah 1500–1510 
Shihab-ud-Din Mahmud Shah II 1510–1531

The interregnum
Bahadur Shah (the sultan of Gujarat) 1531–1537  
Humayun (Mughal emperor) 1535–1540

The later rulers
Qadir Shah 1540–1542 
Shuja'at Khan (the governor of Sher Shah Suri) 1542–1555 
Baz Bahadur 1555–1561

See also 
 Malwa
 Mandu
 List of Sultans of the Malwa Sultanate
 List of Sunni Muslim dynasties

Notes

External links 

 Coins of the Malwa Sultanate

History of Malwa
Former sultanates
Islamic rule in the Indian subcontinent
History of Ujjain